Zoogoneticus is a genus of splitfins that are endemic to the Lerma–Chapala–Grande de Santiago, Armería, Ameca, Cuitzeo and Zacapu basins in west-central Mexico. They inhabit lakes, streams, ponds, canals and ditches, and prefer shallow waters with no or only a moderate current. They are predators that feed on small invertebrates.

Species
There are currently three recognized species in this genus:

 Zoogoneticus purhepechus Domínguez-Domínguez, Pérez-Rodríguez & Doadrio, 2008
 Zoogoneticus quitzeoensis (B. A. Bean, 1898) (Picotee goodeid)
 Zoogoneticus tequila Webb & R. R. Miller, 1998 (Tequila splitfin)

References

Goodeinae
Freshwater fish of Mexico
Endemic fish of Mexico
Freshwater fish genera
Ray-finned fish genera
Taxa named by Seth Eugene Meek